Afrixalus laevis is a species of frog in the family Hyperoliidae. It is found in southern Cameroon, northern Gabon, Bioko (Equatorial Guinea; expected but not recorded in the mainland part of the country), the Democratic Republic of the Congo, and southwestern Uganda. Its range may extend to the neighboring countries. The common names smooth spiny reed frog and Liberian banana frog have been coined for it.

Description
Adult males measure  and adult females  in snout–vent length. The head is large and the eyes protruding. The dorsum is translucent posteriorly and yellowish with a varying brown pattern anteriorly. Also the limbs are transparent. There is a brown canthal stripe that continues behind the eye.

The male advertisement call consists of single clacks.

Habitat and conservation
Afrixalus laevis occurs in forest interior. Unusually for Afrixalus , breeding does not take place in standing water: the eggs are deposited on a leaf (without folding it) near flowing water.

Afrixalus laevis is reasonably common in parts of its range. However, it does not occur in modified habitats, and it is locally threatened by the destruction of its forest habitat caused by agricultural encroachment, expanding human settlements, and collection of wood. It occurs in several protected areas.

References

laevis
Frogs of Africa
Amphibians of Cameroon
Amphibians of the Democratic Republic of the Congo
Amphibians of Equatorial Guinea
Amphibians of Gabon
Amphibians of Uganda
Amphibians described in 1930
Taxa named by Ernst Ahl
Taxonomy articles created by Polbot